Villa La Roche, also Maison La Roche, is a house in Paris, designed by Le Corbusier and his cousin Pierre Jeanneret in 1923–1925. It was designed for Raoul La Roche, a Swiss banker from Basel and collector of avant-garde art. Villa La Roche now houses the Fondation Le Corbusier.

La Roche commissioned Le Corbusier to build a villa as well as a gallery to house his art collection.

In July 2016, the house, Villa Jeanneret, and sixteen other works by Le Corbusier were inscribed as UNESCO World Heritage Sites.

Design and construction

La Roche-Jeanneret house, is a pair of semi-detached houses that was Corbusier's third commission in Paris. They are laid out at right angles to each other. The house exhibits cubist art and purism. The house is designed to be experiential and viewed from a single, fixed point.

Furniture

In 1928, Le Corbusier and Perriand collaborated on furniture, the fruits of their collaboration were first done for Villa La Roche. The furniture items include, three chrome-plated tubular steel chairs designed for two of his projects, The Maison la Roche in Paris and a pavilion for Barbara and Henry Church.

Museum
Maison La Roche is now a museum containing about 8,000 original drawings, studies and plans by Le Corbusier (in collaboration with Pierre Jeanneret from 1922 to 1940), as well as approximately, 450 of his paintings, 30 enamels, 200 works on paper, and a sizeable collection of written and photographic archives. It describes itself as the world's largest collection of Le Corbusier drawings, studies, and plans.

See also
 Villa Jeanneret
 Raoul Albert La Roche (Swiss donator and collector of art)
 Fondation Le Corbusier

References

External links

 Fondation Le Corbusier
 3d model views

Houses in Paris
Le Corbusier buildings in France
Buildings and structures in the 16th arrondissement of Paris
Houses completed in 1925
Art museums and galleries in Paris
Architecture museums
Biographical museums in France
20th-century architecture in France